A food drive is a form of charity that is conducted by a group of individuals or a corporation to stockpile and distribute foodstuffs to people who cannot afford food.

Overview

Food drives are operated in order to stock food banks that distribute food to homeless people, soup kitchens, vulnerable seniors, orphanages, refugees, and victims of disasters. There are also food drives to help people hold feasts on Christmas and Thanksgiving. Many are organized by community organizations, nonprofits, churches, and even individuals.

Criticism 
Many people involved in charity work are critical of the inefficiency of food drives. Emergency food providers are able to buy surplus stock from the food industry at a significant discount, Katherina Rosqueta of the Center for High Impact Philanthropy estimating it at 5% of retail price. Instead of buying canned food at store prices and physically donating it, a monetary donation to the same value could be used to acquire a much greater amount of food, and of a variety chosen by the food charity.

Greg Bloom of Bread for the City expressed concern over the health value of donated food, saying that "almost half of what comes to us in any given food drive just doesn’t meet our nutritional standards".

Largest food drive
The largest food drive by a non-charitable organization in 24 hours was set by the North Carolina School of Science and Mathematics Food drive. It collected 559,885 pounds of food in Durham, North Carolina, USA, on March 5, 2011.

See also
Bake sale
Blood drive
Pending Meal
Toy drive

References

External links

 Illustrative example of Food Drive Challenge, Delhi FoodBank 
 Food Drive FoodAThon by Delhi FoodBank, Aidmatrix Foundation, India

Philanthropy